Charles Brahm (25 July 1917 – 26 May 2003) was a Belgian canoeist who competed in the 1936 Summer Olympics. In 1936 he and his partner Clement Spiette finished ninth in the K-2 10000 m event.

References
Charles Brahm's profile at Sports Reference.com
Charles Brahm's obituary 

1917 births
2003 deaths
Belgian male canoeists
Canoeists at the 1936 Summer Olympics
Olympic canoeists of Belgium
20th-century Belgian people